Woodshop is an independent American film written and directed by Peter Coggan that was released on DVD on September 7, 2010. Produced by Colorado-based 42 Productions, the film originally premiered at the University of Colorado ATLAS Institute in Boulder, Colorado on February 15, 2009.

While in pre-production of a project known as Coda, Pete Coggan came across technological and budgetary issues. Coggan wanted to originally film with a 35mm camera, but was advised to buy the then upcoming Red One camera. Calculating the risk in waiting for its release and experimenting with this new camera for his ambitious science fiction project, Coggan decided to temporarily shelve Coda and make use of the pre-production crew, actors and new technology he had set for it. Over the period of one of weekend, Coggan developed a script from ideas he wrote in high school woodshop class. This became Woodshop, 42 Productions' first self-produced feature film and one of the first to be shot in ultra-high definition with the Red One camera technology.

Plot
Class valedictorian Chris Johnson is a high school senior whose only interested in one thing: maintaining his 4.0 GPA and moving on to an Ivy League school. But when he blows up a classroom in a chemistry class mishap, he receives a devastating "F" that threatens his ambitions. So Chris strikes a deal with the school's principal and agrees to spend one Saturday of detention in the woodshop in exchange for wiping the grade from his record. What Chris didn't count on was having to survive the ex-Army Ranger who runs the woodshop, the eccentric students in class and one kid's plan to blow them all up.

Cast

 Jesse Ventura as Mr. Madson
 Mitch Pileggi as Colonel Miller
 Don S. Davis as Principal Jamison
 Scott Cooper Ryan as Chris Johnson
 Jonathan Davis as Trey
 Olivia Hendrick as Wendy
 Ross Marquand as Gary
 Keegan Ridgley as Craig
 Rod Smith as Mr. Smith, FBI Agent
 Jeffry Sherman Nixon as Paul
 Isaac McGuinness Todd as Tony
 Mitch Todd as Brett
 Nick Holmes as Thad
 Drew Todd as Jim

Woodshop is the first film in which Ventura has acted in ten years, and first since he served as governor of Minnesota. The character of Frank Madson was created with Ventura specifically in mind. Originally, Madson was going to be played by Coggan himself, until Ventura agreed to star in the role, after the writer/director wrote a letter stating that he could not possibly see anyone else in the role of the ex-Army ranger. On his experience working with Coggan and his company, Ventura stated: "I've worked for some of the largest film companies in Hollywood, but I can tell you that working with Pete was one of the most fun and professional experiences that I've ever had."

Soundtrack
Formerly a musician, Coggan along with his friend Sam McGuire wrote the score for the film, which features songs by 3OH!3 and Big Head Todd and the Monsters.

References

External links
 

2009 films
2000s English-language films